This article lists the comprehensive discography of British gothic metal band Paradise Lost.

Albums

Studio albums

Live albums

Compilation albums

EPs

Demos

Singles

Videos

Video albums

Music videos

References

External links
 Paradise Lost official website

Heavy metal group discographies
Discographies of British artists